Ashby's Mill, often referred to as Brixton Windmill, is a restored grade II* listed tower mill at Brixton in the London Borough of Lambeth. The mill was in Surrey when built and has been preserved.

History

Ashby's Mill was built in 1816 and worked by wind until 1862, when the business was transferred to a watermill at Mitcham on the River Wandle. The sails were removed in 1864 and the windmill was relegated to use as a store. In 1902, the lease on the watermill expired and a steam engine was installed in the windmill. This was later replaced by a gas engine. The windmill was worked by engine until 1934, and supplied wholemeal flour to West End hotels and restaurants.

After the war, there were proposals to demolish the mill and build a block of flats. The proposal was rejected and it was decided to conserve the mill, which was restored in 1964 by London County Council. New sails were fitted, and machinery from a derelict windmill at Burgh le Marsh, Lincolnshire installed to replace that which had been removed. The work being done by Thompson's, the Alford millwrights. Following restoration, the mill was opened to the public at Easter 1968. The mill passed to Lambeth Council in 1971 and remains in their ownership. Further restoration was carried out in 1978 and 1983, but the windmill had been placed on the Buildings at Risk Register in 1995.

The Friends of Windmill Gardens had been formed in April 2003 with the aim of restoring the windmill and surrounding area as a public amenity. In September 2004, an archaeological dig was organised, with assistance from the Museum of London Archaeology Service. A £25,000 grant was given by Lambeth Borough Council towards repairs to the mill and gardens. A £2,000,000 restoration plan has been put together with assistance from the Horniman Museum and the Society for the Protection of Ancient Buildings. An application for a grant from the Heritage Lottery Fund was submitted. The Heritage Lottery Fund granted £397,700 towards the restoration. Lambeth Council and the Friends of Windmill Gardens also contributed towards the restoration of the mill, which cost £581,000. The restored mill was officially opened to the public on 2 May 2011 by Chuka Umunna, MP for Streatham.

Description

Ashby's Mill is a four-storey brick tower mill with a boat shaped cap. It had two Patent sails and two Common sails. The cap was winded by a hand wheel, no fantail being fitted. The cast iron windshaft is the only remaining original piece of machinery.

Millers

John Ashby 1816 - 1845
Joshua Ashby 1860s - 1934

References

External links
Brixton Windmill - official site of Ashby's Mill
SPAB - SPAB Mills section
Windmill World webpage on Ashby's mill.

1816 establishments in England
Grade II* listed buildings in the London Borough of Lambeth
History of the London Borough of Lambeth
Grinding mills in the United Kingdom
Tower mills in the United Kingdom
Windmills completed in 1816
Windmills in London
Towers completed in 1816